The 1977 WFA Cup Final was the 8th final of the FA Women's Cup, England's primary cup competition for women's football teams. It was the fifth final to be held under the direct control of Women's Football Association (FA).

Match

The match ended 1-0 to QPR and became the first London women's club to win the FA Women's Cup.

Summary

References

External links
 
 Report at WomensFACup.co.uk

Cup
Women's FA Cup finals
May 1977 sports events in the United Kingdom
1977 sports events in London